The Rum Story is a visitor attraction and museum in Whitehaven, Cumbria, England. It presents the story of the rum trade and the creation of rum. It is located in an original 1785 trading shop and warehouses.

The Rum Story was started with United Kingdom National Lottery funding from the Millennium Commission and opened in May 2000. It was voted Cumbria Tourism's "Small Visitor Attraction" in 2007.

The Jefferson family, wine merchants,  imported wine and spirits for over two centuries until 1998. Their story is covered by The Rum Story. Brothers Henry and Robert Jefferson had joint interests in two estates in Antigua leased from Rear Admiral Sir William Ogilvy, father of Sir John Ogilvy, 9th Baronet.  These were York's Estate (which had 146 enslaved people) and the New Division Estate (309 enslaved people) There is also a Margarett Jefferson listed in connection with the Bahamas, and a Thomas Jefferson in Jamaica.

See also 
 List of museums in Cumbria
 List of food and beverage museums

References

External links 

Commercial buildings completed in 1785
2000 establishments in England
Museums established in 2000
Tourist attractions in Cumbria
Industry museums in England
History museums in Cumbria
Drink-related museums
Rums
Whitehaven